The 2022 Appalachian State Mountaineers softball team represented Appalachian State University during the 2022 NCAA Division I softball season. The Mountaineers played their home games at Sywassink/Lloyd Family Stadium. The Mountaineers were led by fifth-year head coach Shelly Hoerner and were members of the Sun Belt Conference.

Preseason

Sun Belt Conference Coaches Poll
The Sun Belt Conference Coaches Poll was released on January 31, 2022. Appalachian State was picked to finish sixth in the conference with 46 votes.

Preseason All-Sun Belt team
No Mountaineers were chosen to the team.

National Softball Signing Day

Personnel

Schedule and results

Schedule Source:
*Rankings are based on the team's current ranking in the NFCA/USA Softball poll.

References

Appalachian State
Appalachian State softball
Appalachian State Mountaineers softball seasons